The People's State Bank is a historic two-story building in Diller, Nebraska. It was built in 1892-1893 to house the People's State Bank, and it was designed in the Renaissance Revival architectural style. The interior was remodelled and a basement was built in 1910. The building was later acquired by the Diller Historical Society. It has been listed on the National Register of Historic Places since December 13, 1984.

References

National Register of Historic Places in Jefferson County, Nebraska
Renaissance Revival architecture in Nebraska
Bank buildings on the National Register of Historic Places in Nebraska